Vimlesh Paswan is an Indian politician and a member of 18th Legislative Assembly of Uttar Pradesh of India. He represents the Bansgaon constituency of Uttar Pradesh and is a member of the Bharatiya Janata Party.

Political career
Paswan has been a member of the 17th Legislative Assembly of Uttar Pradesh. Since 2017, he has represented the Bansgaon constituency and is a member of the BJP. He defeated Bahujan Samaj Party candidate Dharmendra Kumar by a margin of 22,873 votes.

Posts held

See also
Uttar Pradesh Legislative Assembly

References

Bharatiya Janata Party politicians from Uttar Pradesh
People from Gorakhpur district
Living people
Uttar Pradesh MLAs 2017–2022
1980 births
Uttar Pradesh MLAs 2022–2027